Boisguehenneuc Bay (‘Zaliv Boisguehenneuc’ \'za-liv bo-a-ge-e-'nyok\) is the 6.9 km wide bay indenting for 2.4 km the northwest coast of Liège Island in the Palmer Archipelago, Antarctica.  It is entered northeast of Bebresh Point and southwest of the west extremity of Kran Peninsula, with its head fed by Shterna Glacier.  Raklitsa Island is lying in the central part of the bay.

The bay is named after Lieutenant Charles Marc du Boisguehenneuc (1740-1778), a member of the French expedition of Kerguelen-Trémarec who made the first recorded landing south of the Antarctic Convergence, on Kerguelen Island on 14 February 1772.

Location
British mapping in 1978.

Maps
 British Antarctic Territory.  Scale 1:200000 topographic map.  DOS 610 Series, Sheet W 63 60.  Directorate of Overseas Surveys, UK, 1978.
 Antarctic Digital Database (ADD). Scale 1:250000 topographic map of Antarctica. Scientific Committee on Antarctic Research (SCAR). Since 1993, regularly upgraded and updated.

Notes

References
 Bulgarian Antarctic Gazetteer. Antarctic Place-names Commission. (details in Bulgarian, basic data in English)
 Boisguehenneuc Bay. SCAR Composite Antarctic Gazetteer

External links
 Boisguehenneuc Bay. Copernix satellite image

Bays of Graham Land
Landforms of the Palmer Archipelago
Bulgaria and the Antarctic
Liège Island